Cannakill is an abandoned village located in County Offaly, Ireland.

Location
Cannakill is located to the west of Croghan Hill, south of the Yellow River and about 1 km northwest of Croghan village.

History and archaeology

Cannakill was one of many villages built by Ireland's Norman conquerors after the Norman invasion of Ireland (late 12th century). When the Gaelic Irish lords (the Ua Conchobhair Failghe — O'Connor Faly) regained control of the area after the Battle of Tochar Cruachain-Bri-Ele (1385), the village was abandoned.

The village remnants are composed of the wall footings of four houses. Quarrying led to the discovery of pottery and animal bones to the south of the village during the 1940s.

References

Archaeological sites in County Offaly
National Monuments in County Offaly